A kettle is a vessel for heating water.

Kettle  also may refer to:

 Kettle (surname)

Places
Kettle, Kentucky
Kettle, West Virginia
Kettle Creek (disambiguation)
Kettle Falls, Washington
Kettle Moraine, Wisconsin
Kettle River (disambiguation)
Kettle River, Minnesota
Kettle Valley, British Columbia
Kingskettle, Scotland

Media
Captain Kettle, fictional character in a series of novels by C. J. Cutcliffe Hyne
Ma and Pa Kettle, fictional characters in the 1945 novel The Egg and I by Betty MacDonald and in ten feature films between 1947 and 1957

Other uses
Kettle (birds), a flock in flight
Kettle (landform), remnant body of water
Kettle corn, a type of popcorn
Kettle Chips, a brand of potato chips (crips)
Kettle drum
Kettle Foods, American food manufacturer
Kettle hat
Kettle logic
Kettle War
Kettle (military term), a Soviet military term for encirclement
Kettling, a crowd control tactic
Kettle Restaurants
Cauldron
Suzuki GT750, a motorcycle known informally as the "Kettle"

See also
Kettles (disambiguation)